"Needy" (stylized in all lowercase) is a song by American singer Ariana Grande from her fifth studio album, Thank U, Next (2019) through Republic Records. It was written by Grande, Victoria Monét, Tayla Parx, and its producer Tommy Brown.

"Needy" reached the top 10 in Ireland, Malaysia, Singapore, and the United Kingdom; and top 20 in Australia, Canada, Lithuania, New Zealand, Portugal, and the United States. The song was certified silver by the British Phonographic Industry (BPI) and platnium by Recording Industry Association of America (RIAA).

Background and recording
On October 4, 2018, Grande posted a 45-second snippet on her Instagram with the caption "tell me how good it feels to be needed". On November 5, 2018, Grande posted a second snippet alongside a video of Piggy Smallz on her Instagram Story. On November 15, Grande shared a video of her singing a part of "Needy" with a piano.

Needy was written by Ariana Grande, Victoria Monét, Tayla Parx and Tommy Brown, who also handled the production. Grande's vocals were recorded at the Record Plant in Holywood and Jungle City in New York City. Serban Ghenea mixed the track, and Brendan Morawski as the engineer assisted by Sean Kline.

Critical reception
The song received general acclaim from music critics. Ross Horton from The Line of Best Fit called the song "sexy, lights-off RNB, rich and juicy in equal measure, like some of Rihanna's more sensual moments". Michael Cragg of The Guardian stated that the song "unravels like a series of confessional, self-aware text messages, the sort that aren't necessarily asking for a reply". Sal Cinquemani from Slant Magazine said that in this song that Grande is not afraid to admit that she is "needy".

Commercial performance
Following the release of Thank U, Next, all 12 tracks entered within the top 50 of the US Billboard Hot 100; "Needy" debuted and peaked number 14, becoming the highest-charting non-single track from the album. On June 15, 2020, it received a platinum certification from the Recording Industry Association of America (RIAA). In the United Kingdom, the song reached number eight on the UK Singles Chart and was certified silver by the British Phonographic Industry (BPI). "Needy" debuted on several territories, peaking within the top 50 of Ireland (5), Malaysia (9), Singapore (10), New Zealand (11), Australia (13), Lithuania (14), Canada (16), Portugal (16), Slovakia (23), Latvia (30), Hungary (31), Czech Republic (39), Iceland (40), the Netherlands (41), Scotland (42), and Sweden (43), and further reaching Germany (65), Spain (69), and France (100).

Live performances
Grande performed "Needy" for the first time at the 2019 iHeartRadio Music Awards. The song was part of the setlist of the Sweetener World Tour (2019).

Credits and personnel
Credits adapted from Tidal.
 Ariana Grande – lead vocals, songwriter, vocal producer
 Victoria Monét – backing vocals, songwriter, vocal producer
 Tayla Parx – backing vocals, songwriter, vocal producer
 Tommy Brown – producer, songwriter, programmer
 Peter Lee Johnson – strings
 Billy Hickey – engineer
 Brendan Morawski – engineer
 John Hanes – mixing engineer
 Serban Ghenea – mixer
 Sean Klein – assistant recording engineer

Charts

Certifications

See also
 List of top 10 singles in 2019 (Ireland)
 List of UK top-ten singles in 2019

References

External links
 

2019 songs
Ariana Grande songs
Song recordings produced by Tommy Brown (record producer)
Songs written by Ariana Grande
Songs written by Tayla Parx
Songs written by Tommy Brown (record producer)
Songs written by Victoria Monét